Afonso Alves Martins Júnior (born 30 January 1981), better known as Afonso Alves, is a Brazilian former professional footballer who played as a striker. He represented Atlético Mineiro, Örgryte, Malmö FF, Heerenveen, Middlesbrough, Al-Sadd, Al-Rayyan and Al-Gharafa during a career that spanned between 2001 and 2013. He won eight caps and scored one goal for the Brazil national team, and helped his country win the 2007 Copa América.

Early life
Alves was born on 30 January 1981, in Belo Horizonte, Brazil's third largest city. He was brought up by his mother, Dona Eliade, and has a brother, Alexsander, and sister, Alexandra. His father died when he was nine years old.

Alves started his career with Brazilian side Atlético Mineiro. In 2002, he left Atlético Mineiro for the Swedish club Örgryte from Gothenburg. In 2004, he moved to Malmö FF, where he won the Swedish League that year. He stayed for the 2005 season, scoring 14 in 24 games, becoming the club's top-scorer for the second year running when Malmö finished fifth. Alves was at Malmö for the start of the 2006 season, and scored three goals in seven matches.

Club career

Heerenveen

In Summer 2006, he moved to the Dutch club SC Heerenveen of the Eredivisie for €4.5 million, which remains their highest-ever transfer fee paid.

In his first season, he finished as top goalscorer of the Eredivisie with 34 goals (in 31 games), which is a club record. Alves is the third Brazilian to become topscorer in the Dutch first division, joining former PSV strikers Romário and Ronaldo, and the second Brazilian who scored over 30 goals in the same competition, with Ronaldo netting 30 in the 1994–95 season. Other than finishing first in the scorers table, he was runner-up in the race for the European Golden Boot, a single point behind Roma forward Francesco Totti.

On 7 October 2007, in only his second appearance of the season, Alves scored seven goals in his side's 9–0 victory over Eredivisie rivals Heracles Almelo, setting a new Eredivisie record for most goals scored in a single match. Heerenveen's manager (Gertjan Verbeek) had already made three substitutions yet chose to take Alves off the pitch in the 89th minute to pay tribute to his fantastic performance.

Despite his impressive track record, his departure was surrounded by some controversy after he did not show up at several training sessions, while still under contract at SC Heerenveen and some remarks he made, insinuating that teammates in the Brazil national team laughed at him for playing for such a small club.

Middlesbrough

In the January transfer window of the 2007–08 season he moved to Premier League side Middlesbrough on 31 January 2008. Alves' transfer fee was said to have been €12 million, on a four and a half year contract.

He made his debut on 9 February, against Fulham as a second-half substitute for Lee Dong-Gook. His first Middlesbrough start came on 27 February in an FA Cup home tie against Sheffield United, when he was substituted in the 73 minute. Middlesbrough eventually won the game 1–0.

His first two goals for Middlesbrough came at the Riverside Stadium on 6 April against Manchester United in a 2–2 draw. He finished his first season in England with a hat-trick in an 8–1 home victory against Manchester City.

Alves' first goal of the 2008–09 season came on 30 August, where he scored a 25-yard free-kick which flew into the top corner of the Stoke City net. He then scored goals against Blackburn Rovers and a penalty against Manchester City, two against Barrow and one against local rivals Sunderland with a goal from 18 yards out. However, Alves could not find steady form which led to his record move, and with a haul of just four league goals the season turned out to be a disappointing one for both him and Middlesbrough, who were relegated to the Championship.

Al-Sadd
On 4 September 2009, Alves moved to Al-Sadd on a three-year deal for £7 million. He scored 2 goals in 12 league matches, and scored one goal in the Qatari Stars Cup after three games. Alves then accepted a loan bid from another Qatari League club, Al-Rayyan SC.

Al-Rayyan
On 31 January 2010, Alves was loaned to the Qatari seven-time league champion Al-Rayyan SC, coached by the Brazilian coach Paulo Autuori. Alves scored 18 goals on his loan spell, 9 of them in seven matches of the AFC Cup, and seven goals in seven league matches. He officially moved to Al-Rayyan in May 2010.

Alves officially moved to Al-Rayyan SC for a further two years after winning the 2010 Emir of Qatar Cup with Al Rayyan on 15 May 2010.

Alves shortly emerged as a fan favorite, however he suffered a ligament injury in his left knee in December which kept him out of action for eight months. While recovering, he stated "Offers may’ve come to me during the transfer period, but I never bothered to listen to them and left them all to my agent. While recuperating from surgery, I remained in touch with coach Paulo (Autuori) and the club management, and kept them updated on my progress." He rejoined Al-Rayyan as their top striker and started the 2011–12 season in Al-Rayyan's starting eleven.

Al Gharafa and retirement
On 11 September 2012, he signed a one–year deal with QSL club Al Gharafa as their fourth professional player.

Having been a free agent for over two seasons, Alves announced his retirement from professional football on his Instagram page on 5 October 2015. Alves had been training with the youth team of his former club Heerenveen the days before his decision to retire.

International career
On 17 May 2007, Alves received his first call-up for the Brazil national team for friendlies against England and Turkey. On 1 June, in the game against England, Alves was brought on to replace Kaká after 71 minutes of play and very nearly scored after a Wes Brown slip. He was also part of the Brazilian squad which won the 2007 Copa América in Venezuela. Alves scored his first international goal on 12 September 2007 against Mexico in a 3–1 win.

Personal life
Alves left Brazil as a 21-year-old in 2002 to move to Sweden. He has a son, Felipe Henrique, who is a footballer at Atletico Mineiro's Tupinambas Academy, and lives with Alves' former girlfriend in Brazil.

Career statistics

Club

International

Scores and results list Brazil's goal tally first, score column indicates score after Alves goal.

Honours
Malmö FF
Allsvenskan: 2004

Al-Rayyan
Emir of Qatar Cup: 2010
Qatar Crown Prince Cup: 2012
Brazil

 Copa América: 2007

Individual
Eredivisie top scorer: 2006–07
Dutch Footballer of the Year: 2007
AFC Cup top scorer: 2010

References

External links

  
 
 
 
 Afonso Alves: Slavery And Racism In Holland?

1981 births
Living people
Footballers from Belo Horizonte
Association football forwards
Brazilian footballers
Clube Atlético Mineiro players
Örgryte IS players
Malmö FF players
SC Heerenveen players
Middlesbrough F.C. players
Al Sadd SC players
Al-Rayyan SC players
Al-Gharafa SC players
Allsvenskan players
Eredivisie players
Premier League players
Qatar Stars League players
2007 Copa América players
Brazil international footballers
Brazilian expatriate footballers
Brazilian expatriate sportspeople in Sweden
Brazilian expatriate sportspeople in the Netherlands
Brazilian expatriate sportspeople in England
Brazilian expatriate sportspeople in Qatar
Expatriate footballers in England
Expatriate footballers in Sweden
Expatriate footballers in the Netherlands
Expatriate footballers in Qatar
Copa América-winning players